"We Got the Funk" is single by East Coast hip hop group The Beatnuts. It was released by Loud Records in 2002 as a 12 inch single after being featured on Classic Nuts, Vol. 1, a Beatnuts hits album. The song is produced by The Beatnuts and features raps by Juju and Psycho Les, as well as a chorus performed by Mellanie. The song's lyrics are boastful of The Beatnuts' musical ability and sexual prowess. The song's beat, characterized by a slow funky guitar loop, deep bassline and pounding drums, samples "It's So Different Here" by Rachel Sweet. Although included on a greatest hits album, "We Got the Funk" never charted, received music video treatment or was released in CD format.

In popular culture
This was featured in several commercials for vans.

Single track list

A-Side
 "We Got the Funk (Clean)" (3:20)
 "We Got the Funk (Explicit)" (3:20)
 "We Got the Funk (Instrumental)" (3:20)

B-Side
 "We Got the Funk (Clean)" (3:20)
 "We Got the Funk (Explicit)" (3:20)
 "We Got the Funk (Instrumental)" (3:20)

We Got the Funk
We Got the Funk
2002 songs
Loud Records singles